Review of Palaeobotany and Palynology is a peer-reviewed scientific journal of palaeobotany and palynology established in 1967. It is published by Elsevier on a monthly basis. The journal is edited by H. Kerp (Westfälische Wilhelms-Universität Münster) and M. Stephenson (British Geological Survey).

Abstracting and indexing
The journal is abstracted and indexed in the following databases:

According to the Journal Citation Reports, the journal has a 2014 impact factor of 1.904.

References

External links

Paleontology journals
Elsevier academic journals
Monthly journals
Publications established in 1967
English-language journals